The Querimonia is a legal document written in Latin that details the political and administrative autonomy granted to the Aran Valley (Catalonia, Spain) by James II of Aragon in 1313. The valley maintained a special status until 1834 when the queen regent María Cristina forced the integration of the valley with the province of Lleida. In 1990, the Aranese once again achieved a measure of autonomy when the autonomous community of Catalonia devolved power to the local government, giving them control over education, sanitation, culture, environment, agriculture and tourism.

Rights
The querimonia confirmed and ceded the following rights to the Aranese:
Free and explicit common ownership by the Aranese of their mountains without tribute or subsidy; with the freedom of pasture for all meadows and fields
Free use of the forests
Free use of water, for irrigation as well as mills
The freedom to fish and hunt
Exemption from all royal servitude, burden, and imposition
Recognition of the traditional Aranese convinença and the torneria.

In return, the Aranese agreed to pay a tribute once per year to the king called the Galin Reiau, consisting of a quantity of wheat per resident of the valley.

See also

Notes

References

Sources
 

Val d'Aran
1313 in Europe
Political charters